The Wilkes County School District (also called "Wilkes County Schools") is a public school district in Wilkes County, Georgia, USA, based in Washington, Georgia. It serves the communities of Rayle, Tignall, and Washington.

Schools
The Wilkes County School District has two elementary schools, one middle school, and one high school.

Elementary schools
Washington-Wilkes Elementary School
Washington-Wilkes Primary School

Middle school
Washington-Wilkes Middle School

High school
Washington-Wilkes Comprehensive High School

References

External links

School districts in Georgia (U.S. state)
Education in Wilkes County, Georgia